Richard Bausch (born April 18, 1945) is an American novelist and short story writer, and Professor in the Writing Program at Chapman University in Orange, California. He has published twelve novels, eight short story collections, and one volume of poetry and prose.

Bausch holds a B.A. from George Mason University, and an M.F.A. from the Iowa Writers' Workshop at the University of Iowa. He joined with the writer and editor R. V. Cassill to bring out the 6th edition of The Norton Anthology of Short Fiction. Since Cassill's death in 2002, he has been the sole editor of that anthology, bringing out the 7th and 8th editions.

Early life and education 
Bausch was born in 1945 in Fort Benning, Georgia. He is the twin brother of author Robert Bausch.

He served in the U.S. Air Force between 1966–1969, and toured the Midwest and South singing in a rock band, doing stand-up comedy, and writing poetry. He holds a B.A. from George Mason University, and an M.F.A. from the Iowa Writers' Workshop at the University of Iowa. Since 1974, He has taught English and Creative Writing at The University of Iowa, George Mason University, The University of Memphis, The University of Tennessee, Beloit College, Stanford University, and Chapman University. He was previously Heritage Chair in Writing at George Mason University; and Moss Chair of Excellence in the Writing Program at The University of Memphis He now lives in Orange, California.

Writing 
Bausch's novels and stories vary from explorations of fear and love in family life, to novels with historical backdrops, including Rebel Powers (1993), Good Evening Mr. & Mrs. America, and All the Ships at Sea (1996), Hello to the Cannibals (2002), and Peace (2008). He published his first short story in The Atlantic in April 1983: "All the Way in Flagstaff, Arizona" was initially an 800-page novel that he cut down, calling the process "like passing a kidney stone". He is a contributor of short stories to various periodicals, including The Atlantic Monthly, Esquire, Harper's, The New Yorker, Playboy, Ploughshares, Narrative, and The Southern Review.   His work has also been represented in anthologies, including O. Henry Prize Stories and Best American Short Stories.

Awards and film adaptations 
Bausch received a National Endowment for the Arts grant in 1982, a Guggenheim Fellowship in 1984, the Hillsdale Prize of The Fellowship of Southern Writers in 1991, The Lila Wallace-Reader's Digest Writers' Award in 1992, the American Academy of Arts and Letters' Award in Literature in 1993, and was elected to the Fellowship of Southern Writers in 1995. (He served as chancellor of the Fellowship from 2007–2010.) His novel, Take Me Back (1982) and his first story collection, Spirits and Other Stories (1987), were nominated for the PEN/Faulkner Award, Two of his short stories, "The Man Who Knew Belle Star" and "Letter To The Lady of The House", won the National Magazine Award in fiction for The Atlantic Monthly and The New Yorker, respectively. In 2004, he won the PEN/Malamud Award for short story excellence.

His novel Peace won the 2009 Dayton Literary Peace Prize. and the W.Y. Boyd Literary Award for Excellence in Military Fiction of American Library Association.

Bausch was the 2012 winner of the $30,000 Rea Award for his work in the short story.

To date, three feature films have been made from Bausch's work: The Last Good Time, in 1995, adapted by Bob Balaban from his novel of that title; 'Endangered Species in 2017, adapted from six Bausch stories by French Director Gilles Bourdos (Inquietudes "Afterwards;" "Renoir") and RECON adapted by Robert David Port, from Bausch's novel PEACE. A fourth film is in process, adapted by Julie Lipson, of the Bausch story “The Man Who Knew Belle Starr.”

 Publications 
 Novels Real Presence, 1980Take Me Back, 1981The Last Good Time, 1984 (made into a film by Bob Balaban in 1995)Mr. Field's Daughter, 1989Violence, 1992.Rebel Powers, 1993Good Evening Mr. and Mrs. America, and All the Ships at Sea, 1996In the Night Season, 1998Hello To the Cannibals, 2002Thanksgiving Night, 2006Peace, 2008Before, During, After, Aug. 2014Playhouse, Feb. 2023

 Short fiction Spirits, And Other Stories, 1987The Fireman's Wife, And Other Stories, 1990Rare & Endangered Species, 1994Selected Stories of Richard Bausch (The Modern Library), 1996Someone To Watch Over Me: Stories, 1999The Stories of Richard Bausch, 2003Wives & Lovers: 3 Short Novels, 2004Something is Out There, 2010Living in the Weather of the World, April 2017

 Poetry and non-fiction These Extremes, Louisiana State University Press, 2009 (a collection of poems and prose)The Norton Anthology of Short Fiction,'' 7th edition, 2005 (as editor with the late R.V. Cassill).

References

External links 
 
 
 
 

1945 births
Living people
American historical novelists
American male non-fiction writers
American male novelists
American male short story writers
American military writers
Chapman University faculty
George Mason University alumni
George Mason University faculty
Iowa Writers' Workshop alumni
Novelists from Georgia (U.S. state)
Novelists from Tennessee
Novelists from Virginia
PEN/Faulkner Award for Fiction winners
PEN/Malamud Award winners
20th-century American male writers
20th-century American non-fiction writers
20th-century American novelists
20th-century American short story writers
21st-century American male writers
21st-century American non-fiction writers
21st-century American novelists
21st-century American short story writers
American twins
University of Iowa alumni
University of Memphis faculty